St. Margaret's Church, Lee, is a Church of England parish church in Lee, London. It was built between 1839 and 1841 in a simple early Victorian style (to a design by Norwich architect John Brown), replacing an earlier church which had been built on the foundations of the older mediaeval church nearby dating to around 1120.  It is Anglican and is located on the south side of Lee Terrace/Belmont Hill, in Lee Green, south-east London.

Extensive and lavish interior decoration was carried out between the years of 1875 and 1900.

By 1980 it had fallen into dilapidation and an extensive 20-year restoration programme was carried out. On completion of the restoration, the church is one of the best preserved examples of a decorated gothic revivalist interior in London.

Between 1813 and 1830 there had been an attempt to rebuild the medieval church, involving the architect Joseph Gwilt. This failed when it became clear that the foundations of the old church were incapable of supporting a new building. The ruins of the original building are in the medieval churchyard on the north side of Lee Terrace. The tomb of Edmond Halley (1656–1742), from 1720 England's second Astronomer Royal and the discoverer of the periodicity of Halley's Comet is in the churchyard, one of three Astronomers Royal buried at St. Margaret's (Nathaniel Bliss and John Pond are the others). Also notable is the tomb of Sir Samuel Fludyer, 1st Baronet and his family. James Annesley, a celebrated claimant to the Earldom of Anglesey, was buried in the churchyard in an unmarked grave.

Graves in the churchyard around the current church include one for wealthy builder William Webster, his wife, and chemical engineer son, William who lived at nearby Wyberton House on Lee Terrace.

References

External links

The Church's Parish Website
Current Church
Parish History
Craftsmen and Women
Old Church Yard
Gallery of interior features

19th-century Church of England church buildings
Lee
Churches completed in 1841
Lee
Victorian architecture in England
Lee, London
Grade II* listed buildings in the London Borough of Lewisham
Grade II* listed churches in London